Scott Moninger is an American professional road racing cyclist. He was born October 20, 1966 in Atlanta, Georgia, grew up in Wichita, Kansas, and moved to Boulder, Colorado, in the mid 1980s to further his career in cycling. Moninger turned professional in 1991 with the Coors Light Team directed by Len Pettyjohn. Since then, he has won nearly every road race in North America with over 275 career victories, the most by any American rider at the time of retirement.  

Scott retired from racing in 2007, racing his final year as a pro with the BMC Racing Team.   He is currently a commentator for road racing coverage on the NBC Sports Network as an analyst for the Tour de France.  He is a master-level cycling coach with Velocious Endurance Coaching, as well as a camp guide for Velocious Cycling Adventures. He is also the National Brand Ambassador for Speedplay pedals.

Significant career highlights
  Professional racing career spanning 17 years, over 275 career victories
  1992 and 2005,  #1 ranked road rider in the USA (NRC Series)
  6-time Winner Mt Evans/Bob Cook Memorial Hill Climb
  4-time Winner Cascade Cycling Classic
  4-time Winner Nevada city Classic
  2-time Winner of the Redlands Classic
 Two-time winner, Tour de 'Toona
 Two-time winner, Tour of the Gila
  1st Overall 1996 Suntour, Melbourne, Australia
  1st  Boulder to Breckenridge  “Zinger Classic” 2000
  1st Overall 2006 Tour of Utah
  Voted VeloNews North American Male road cyclist of the year, 2005 
  US National Road team member 1987 – 1990
  US World Amateur Road team member – 1990, Japan
  US World Professional Road Team member - 1999 Verona, Italy

Suspension
He was suspended for one year due to testing positive for the banned substance 19-norandrosterone. It was later proven by lab results from the same batch of supplements that the banned substance was not labeled on the product container of over-the-counter supplements.

Teams 
 2007:  BMC Professional Cycling Team
 2003-2006 :  Health Net Pro Cycling Team Presented by Maxxis
 1999-2002:  Mercury Pro Cycling Team
 1997-1998:  Navigators Pro Cycling Team
 1995-1996:  Chevrolet/LA Sheriff's Pro Cycling Team
 1990-1994:  Coors Light
 1989-1990:  Team Crest

Racing results 

1989
 1st Overall, Tour of Canada
 1st Overall, Redlands Classic

 1992
 1st, West-Virginia Mountain Classic
 1st in General Classification Mammoth Classic (USA)
 1st in General Classification Killington Stage Race (USA
 1st Stage 2, 1st Stage 4, Killington Stage Race
 1st Stage 3, Casper Classic
 1st in Boulder (c) (USA) 
 1st in Columbus (USA) 
 1st in Stage 1 Mammoth Classic (USA) 
 1st in Stage 4 Mammoth Classic (USA) 
1993
 1st Stage 12, Herald Sun Tour
 1st in Boulder (USA) 
 1st Stage 4 Cascade Classic (USA) 
 1st Stage 2 Killington Stage Race (USA) 
 1st Stage 4 Killington Stage Race (USA) 
 1st Stage 2 Mazda Tour (AUS) 
 1st Stage 4 Mazda Tour (AUS) 
 1st Norman Campus (USA) 
 1st in Seattle (USA) 
1994
 1st Stage 6, West Virginia Classic
 1st in Broomfield (USA) 
 1st Nevada City Classic (USA) 
 1st in Santa Cruz (USA) 
 1st General Classification Tour de Toona (USA) 
1995
 1st overall, Redlands Classic Stage Race
 1st Visalia (USA) 
 1st Stage 3 Cascade Classic (USA) 
 1st in Denver (USA) 
 2nd overall, Killington Stage Race
1996
 1st overall General Classification, 1st Stage 5, Herald Sun Tour
 1st in Stage 4 Herald Sun Tour (AUS) 
1997
 1st Niwot (USA) 
 1st Nevada City Classic (USA) 
1998
 1st, Mount Evans Hill Climb
 1st Stage 11, 1st Stage 12, King of the Mountain, Herald Sun Tour
 1st General Classification Colorado Classic (USA) 
 1st Salem (USA) 
 1st Arlington Classic Criterium (USA) 
 1st Athens (c) (USA) 
 1st Stage 5 Cascade Classic (USA) 
 1st Castle Rock (USA) 
 1st Stage 2 Colorado Classic (USA) 
 1st Golden (USA) 
 1st Greensboro (USA) 
 1st Stage 11 Herald Sun Tour (AUS) 
 1st Stage 12 Herald Sun Tour (AUS) 
 1st Prologue Killington Stage Race (USA) 
 1st Stage 4 Killington Stage Race (USA) 
 1st Stage 5 Tour de Toona (USA) 
1999
 3rd overall, Grand Prix Cycliste De Beauce
 Member, U.S. World Championship Road Team - Verona, Italy
 1st General Classification Cascade Classic (USA) 
 1st Nevada City Classic (USA) 
 1st Santa Rosa, Criterium (USA)
 1st in Boulder (USA) 
 1st in Stage 2 Cascade Classic (USA) 
 1st in Stage 3 Cascade Classic (USA) 
 1st in Stage 6 Cascade Classic (USA) 
2000
 1st Stage 4a, Grand Prix Cycliste De Beauce
 2nd overall, Herald Sun Tour
 1st overall, Celestial Seasonings Red Zinger Cycling Challenge
 1st Bob Cook Memorial-Mount Evans (USA) 
 1st General Classification Cascade Classic (USA)
 1st General Classification Tour of Willamette (USA)
 1st in Boulder (USA)  
 1st in Sara Kay Memorial (USA) 
 1st Stage 1 Tour of Willamette (USA) 
 1st Stage 3 Tour of Willamette (USA)  
 1st Stage 2 Valley of the Sun Stage Race (USA) 
 1st Castle Rock (USA) 
 1st Zinger Cycling Challenge (USA) 
 1st Stage 1 Cascade Classic, Three Sisters Loop (USA) 
 1st Stage 5 Cascade Classic, Tumalo (USA) 
 1st Stage 6 Tour de Toona (USA) 
2001
 2nd overall and 1st Stage 6a, Grand Prix Cycliste De Beauce
 1st General Classification Green Mountain Stagerace (USA)
 1st Bob Cook Memorial-Mount Evans (USA)
 1st General Classification Cascade Classic (USA)
 1st General Classification Tour of the Gila (USA) 
 1st in Idaho Springs (USA) 
 1st in Golden (USA) 
 1st Mortgage Mart (USA) 
 1st Tour de Lafayette (USA) 
 1st Stage 1 Tour of Willamette (USA) 
 1st Stage 4 Tour of Willamette (USA) 
 1st Stage 1 Tour of the Gila, Tyrone (USA) 
 1st Stage 2 Tour of the Gila, Mogollan (USA) 
 1st Stage 5 Tour of the Gila, Gila Monster (USA) 
 1st Wichita (USA) 
 1st Stage 6 part a Tour de Beauce, Saint Georges (CAN) 
 1st Stage 2 Cascade Classic (USA) 
 1st Stage 5 Cascade Classic (USA) 
 1st Stage 1 Green Mountain Stagerace (USA) 
 1st Stage 3 Green Mountain Stagerace (USA) 
2002
 1st overall, 2 stage wins, La Vuelta De Bisbee Stage Race, Arizona
 1st, Mount Evans Hill Climb, Idaho Springs, Colorado
 1 stage win, Tour of the Gila, New Mexico
 1st in Snelling (USA) 
 1st Stage 1 Vuelta de Bisbee (USA) 
 1st Stage 3 Vuelta de Bisbee, Warren (USA) 
 1st Stage 4 Vuelta de Bisbee (USA) 
2003
 1st Stage 11, Herald Sun Tour
2004
 1st Overall, 3 stage wins, Tour of the Gila, New Mexico
 1st Overall, 2 stage wins, Mercy Classic, Arkansas
 1st Overall, 1 stage win, Boulder Stage Race
 1st Stage 6, International Tour de 'Toona
 1st Stage 1, Tri-Peaks Challenge, Arkansas
 1st Stage 5, Estes Park Challenge
 1st Overall, 1 stage win, Tour of Kansas City
 1st Stazio Crit, Round 1, Boulder, Colorado
 1st Stazio Crit, Round 2, Boulder, Colorado
 1st, Iron Horse Road Race, Colorado
 1st, Durango Downtown Criterium, Colorado
 1st, Coal Miner's Classic, Colorado
 National FIAC Hill Climb Champion
2005
 1st Overall, Cascade Cycling Classic
 1st Overall, International Tour de Toona
 1st Overall, San Dimas Stage Race
 1st Overall, Joe Martin Stage Race
 1st Overall, Tour de Nez
 1st Overall, Rocky Mountain Omnium
 1st KoM Classification, International Tour de Toona
 1st Stage 6, International Tour de Toona
 1st Stage 2, Cascade Cycling Classic
 1st Stage 1 ITT, San Dimas Stage Race
 1st Stage 3, Tri Peaks Challenge
 1st Stages 2 and 3, Tour de Nez
 1st, Mt. Evans Hill Climb/National FIAC Hill Climb Championship
 1st, Colorado State TT Championship
 1st, Scholfield Cycling Classic
 1st, Parker Criterium
2006
 1st, Mt. Evans Hill Climb/National FIAC Hill Climb Championship
 1st Overall, General Classification, Tour of Utah
 1st Stazio (USA) 
 1st Koppenberg USA (USA) 
 1st Oredigger Classic (USA) 
 1st Tokyo Joe's Spring (USA) 
 1st Stage 2 Tour of the Gila, Mogollon (USA) 
 1st Stage 3 Joe Martin Stage Race (USA) 
 1st Stage 6 Mount Hood Classic (USA) 
 1st Nevada City Classic (USA) 
 1st Bob Cook Memorial-Mount Evans (USA) 
 1st Stage 4 Tour of Utah, Mt. Nebo (USA) 
 1st Stage 2 Parker Mainstreet Omnium (USA) 
2007
 1st Sunshine Canyon Hill Climb
 1st Stage 1, Redlands Bicycle Classic
 1st Boulder TT Series Number 4 - Course Record
 1st Stage 1 San Dimas Stage Race, San Dimas (USA) 
 1st General Classification San Dimas Stage Race (USA) 
 1st Stage 1 Redlands Bicycle Classic, Oak Glen (USA) 
 1st Stage 5 Tour of the Gila, Gila (USA) 
Race results

See also
 List of doping cases in cycling
 List of sportspeople sanctioned for doping offences

References

External links 
 2005 Pezcyclingnews interview of Scott Moninger by Matt Wood

American male cyclists
1966 births
Living people
Sportspeople from Atlanta
Doping cases in cycling
Cyclists from Georgia (U.S. state)